Prostanthera ferricola is a species of flowering plant in the family Lamiaceae and is endemic to central Western Australia. It is an erect, openly branched shrub with aromatic, egg-shaped leaves and mauve-purple flowers arranged in four to twelve leaf axils near the end of branchlets.

Description
Flowering occurs from July to September.

Taxonomy
Prostanthera ferricola was first formally described in 1987 by Barry Conn and Kelly Anne Shepherd in the journal Nuytsia from specimens collected in the Robinson Ranges in 2006.

Distribution and habitat
This mintbush grows in sparse Acacia aneura shrubland in the Murchison and Gascoyne biogeographic regions of Western Australia.

Conservation status
Prostanthera ferricola is classified "Priority Three" by the Government of Western Australia Department of Parks and Wildlife meaning that it is poorly known and known from only a few locations but is not under imminent threat.

References

ferricola
Flora of Western Australia
Lamiales of Australia
Taxa named by Barry John Conn
Plants described in 2007
Taxa named by Kelly Anne Shepherd